Hugh (died 1218) was an early 13th-century bishop of Brechin. He either from the native Gaelic ecclesiastical family of Brechin who provided the abbots and the early bishops of Brechin, men such as Léot and Samson, or else a royal clerk appointed by the king. He was bishop as early as 1214, when he appears in the sources for the first time. He died in 1218, and was succeeded by Gregory.

References
Dowden, John, The Bishops of Scotland, ed. J. Maitland Thomson, (Glasgow, 1912)

External links
Genealogical chart of ruling family of the Church of Brechin (by Dauvit Broun)

12th-century births
Bishops of Brechin (pre-Reformation)
Medieval Gaels from Scotland
13th-century Scottish Roman Catholic bishops
1218 deaths